The North Footscray Football Club is an Australian rules football club which compete in the Western Region Football League (WRFL) since 1935.
They are based in the Melbourne suburb of Footscray. They have won 3 senior premierships in division 1 and 4 senior premierships in division 2 and numerous premierships in lower grades. In 2016 the club consists of 2 senior teams  and auskick.

Honours
 Western Region Football League
 Division One (3): 1978, 1980, 1983
 Division One Reserves (1): 1980
 Division One U18 (2): 1936, 1937
 Division Two (4): 1938, 1949, 2010, 2017
 Division Two Reserves (5): 1998, 1999, 2001, 2002, 2008
 Division Two U18 (1): 2005
 U16 C: 2012
 U15 C: 1985
 U14 C: 1997, 1998
 U12 C: 2003, 2012

League best and fairest winners
 Div 1 Seniors =  E.Spence 1952  J Charles 1959 1963  R Murray 1961  T Flint 1971  A Ebeyer 1979
 Div 1 Reserves =  J Anderson 1975  Greg Spurling 1987
 U18 Div 1  =  J Watters  1941  J Miller 1956  K Beamish 1958  D Crea 1991
 Div 2 Seniors =    D Williams 2003, 2004 K Murphy 2016
  Div 2 Reserves = M Bellingham 2016
 U18B =     B Lucas    2008
 U16B =     M Mumford 1961  N Richardson  2004  K Klix 2009
 U15B =    T Ebeyer  1973
 U14A =     M Coles   1999
 U14B =     J Ebeyer  1970
 U14C =     D DaSilva 1997  D Ellis 1998  M Eason 2008
 U13B =     C Pagano  1976
 U13C =     S Blomeley 1984  R Blomeley 1987
 U12C =     S Smith   2002  D Sawad 2003  J Bennett 2008  K Bharati 2012
 U11B =     C Pagano  1974  R Blomeley 1985

Bibliography
 History of the WRFL/FDFL by Kevin Hillier – 
 History of football in Melbourne's north west by John Stoward –

References

External links
Official Facebook

Australian rules football clubs in Melbourne
Australian rules football clubs established in 1934
1934 establishments in Australia
Western Region Football League clubs
Sport in the City of Maribyrnong